John Harrison Younger (1851 – March 17, 1874) was an American outlaw, the brother of Cole, Jim and Bob. He was briefly a member of the James–Younger Gang, a band of outlaws who also included the infamous Jesse James.

Origins
He was the 11th child of Henry Washington Younger and Bersheba Leighton Fristoe's 14 children and their fifth son, the fourth to survive into adulthood.

In July 1862, his father was shot and killed while on a business trip to Kansas City by a detachment of Union militiamen. As a result of this killing, several of John's brothers joined Quantrill's Raiders, but John and his younger brother Bob were too young to join so they stayed at home to look after their mother and sisters.

Killing of Gillcreas
In January 1866, Bob and John took their mother to Independence, Missouri, to purchase winter supplies. Recognizing the family from his military days an ex-soldier named Gillcreas  came up to the wagon and made some comments about Cole. John told him to be quiet and the soldier slapped him around the face with a frozen fish. John got out his brother's pistol (Cole's that they had taken to be repaired) and shot him between the eyes.

After an examination of the body it was revealed the soldier was carrying a heavy slingshot that still was tied to his wrist, so the killing was ruled as self-defense.

Texas and Missouri
The Youngers headed to Texas for a peaceful life until illness fell on Bersheba so the boys (with the exception of Cole) took her back to Missouri to die.

As soon as they arrived they were harassed, Bob was knocked unconscious, and John was hung four times, and the fourth time they hung him the rope dug deep into his flesh. They cut him down and hacked at the body with knives. He survived. Witnessing this was too much for Bersheba and she died on June 6, 1870, her 54th birthday.

After Bersheba's funeral John and Bob met up with Jim and, because it was not safe to stay in one place, they often moved between Missouri and Texas.

On January 20, 1871, he shot and killed two Texas deputy sheriffs.

James–Younger Gang

In 1873 Jim, John and Bob Younger joined the James–Younger Gang.

Death

On March 17, 1874, Jim and John were headed to some friends in Roscoe, Missouri. Three men, local deputy sheriff Edward Daniels and two Pinkerton detectives asked them for directions. Suspecting that they were detectives Jim and John ambushed them. One of the agents fled. While interviewing the remaining two, the detective, Louis Lull, drew a hidden pistol and shot John through the neck. Jim killed Deputy Daniels, while John pursued Lull on horseback to nearby woods, fatally wounding him in the chest. Emerging from the woods still on horseback, as Jim ran towards him, John swayed and fell dead. Jim buried him by the roadside to avoid the law digging him up. Later he removed his body to bury him in an unmarked grave in the cemetery. Louis Lull died three days later. John Younger is buried in the Yeater-Cleveland Cemetery in St. Clair County, Missouri, about 4–5 miles NW of Oceola, MO.

References

Further reading
Guthrie, Judith W. 1999. St. Clair County History. Volume II. Cemeteries. St. Clair County Historical Society. Lowry City, MO.

External links
Younger family genealogy on the official website for Frank & Jesse James Ancestry
 

1851 births
1874 deaths
Outlaws of the American Old West
American bank robbers
James–Younger Gang
American people convicted of murder
People from Lee's Summit, Missouri
Deaths by firearm in Missouri